The 1954–55 DFB-Pokal was the 12th season of the annual German football cup competition. It began on 15 August 1954 and ended on 21 May 1955. 32 teams competed in the tournament of five rounds. In the final Karlsruher SC defeated Schalke 04 3–2.

Matches

First round

Replays

Round of 16

Replay

Quarter-finals

Semi-finals

Replay

Final

References

External links
 Official site of the DFB 
 Kicker.de 
 1954-55 results at Fussballdaten.de 

1954-55
1954–55 in German football cups